RollOnFriday (also known as ROF) is a British website designed for and used by those involved in the legal profession, from law students to qualified solicitors and barristers including Queen's Counsel. Its readership includes journalists and others from outside the profession, as well as increasingly few practising lawyers.

History and content
The site was established in 2000 by Matthew Rhodes and Piers Warburton. The two met while solicitors at the London law firm Ashurst (where Warburton still works as a partner). Warburton said at the time that the site was intended to be 'young, irreverent and a bit cheeky'.

From launch, the site provided weekly news stories, detailed information on individual law firms  - including the salaries they pay - and weekly features such as 'glamorous solicitor'  showcasing some of the more interesting looking of the world's lawyers.

In 2001, the website launched the discussion board and more recently has developed a jobs database and other recruitment facilities. Over the years, the site has grown in popularity and is now an established part of the legal market. Over 50 of the UK's leading law firms use it as a means of advertising and make use of its graduate and lateral recruitment databases: Fast Track and Make Me An Offer.

The website had a major revamp at the end of May 2009 and another in 2018.

Mentions from outside
On occasion, stories are broken on the website, legal and otherwise, which are taken up in national newspapers. The following is a list of some outside mentions.
National newspapers
The Times
http://www.timesonline.co.uk/article/0,,200-2177760.html
http://www.timesonline.co.uk/article/0,,2-1750863,00.html
http://www.timesonline.co.uk/article/0,,4003-2189092.html
http://www.timesonline.co.uk/article/0,,2-1750863_1,00.html
The Independent

The Guardian
http://www.guardian.co.uk/guardian_jobs_and_money/story/0,,1211702,00.html
The Daily Telegraph

Legal journals
The Lawyer
http://www.thelawyer.com/cgi-bin/item.cgi?id=106327&d=11&h=24&f=23
The Law Society Gazette
http://www.lawgazette.co.uk/features/view=feature.law?FEATUREID=241307
Universities
Various UK and overseas universities recommend the site to law students for information about UK law firms
University of Hull
http://www.hull.ac.uk/law/courses/ug/lawyer.html
Imperial College
http://www.union.ic.ac.uk/scc/law/links.html
Lancaster University
http://www.lancs.ac.uk/fass/law/current/resources/careers/index.htm
the University of Victoria
http://cdo.law.uvic.ca/CareerResearch.html

References

External links
RollOnFriday

Internet forums
British news websites
Solicitors
Internet properties established in 2000
Legal websites